Listen is the second and final album from the Danish boy band C21, released on May 24, 2004.

Track listing

External links 
Listen at Discogs

C21 (band) albums
2004 albums